Steamship Princess Victoria was a luxury passenger ship built in 1902 and operated by the Canadian Pacific Railway. Subsequently, converted into a bulk oil carrier under the name Tahsis No. 3, the ship struck a rock and sank on 10 March 1953.

Princess Victoria was built in Wallsend, Newcastle upon Tyne, England, by the shipyards of CS Swan & Hunter Company. Christened on 18 November 1902, she arrived in Victoria, British Columbia on 28 March 1903. While the ship burned coal when it was built, Princess Victoria was converted to oil fuel in 1912. During her time in Victoria, Princess Victoria ran routes between Victoria, Vancouver and Seattle, Washington.

Princess Victoria was involved in a major accident on 26 August 1914, when she rammed and sank  in Puget Sound during heavy fog.

Laid up in 1950, Princess Victoria was sold to Tahsis & Company of Vancouver in November 1951 and converted into a bulk oil carrier named Tahsis No. 3. Shortly after the conversion, the ship struck a rock on 10 March 1953 and sank in Welcome Pass, a narrow passageway north of Vancouver, British Columbia.

After its sinking, it was broken up at the Victoria Capital Iron Works and its engine room, telegraph, and steering were re-purposed for the MV Uchuck III which still runs today.

References 

 Gaeng, Betty Lou. "The Sinking of the Admiral Sampson," The Sounder. Vol. 25, No. 2. Sno-Isle Genealogical Society, 2011. Retrieved Aug. 29, 2014.

External links
Damaged bow of steamer Princess Victoria after sinking Admiral Sampson

Ocean liners
Steamships of Canada
1902 ships
Shipwrecks of the British Columbia coast
Ships built by Swan Hunter
Maritime incidents in August 1914
Maritime incidents in 1953